Train of Dreams is a 1987 Canadian film directed by John N. Smith and starring Jason St. Amour, Christopher Neil and Frederick Eugene Ward as a popular teacher.  In this documentary-style drama, a delinquent teenager tries to put his life on the right track.

Awards
The film won the Special Jury Prize at the Chicago International Film Festival in 1987, and was nominated for four Genie Awards in 1988. Jason St. Amour also won the Best Actor award at the Paris Film Festival in 1989.

References

External links 
 
 Train of Dreams at NFB Web site

1987 films
English-language Canadian films
National Film Board of Canada films
Films directed by John N. Smith
1987 drama films
Canadian docufiction films
Canadian drama films
1980s English-language films
1980s Canadian films